National Craft Butchers, is an organisation based in Tunbridge Wells.  Founded as The National Federation of Meat Traders, from 1994 to July 2018 it was known as the National Federation of Meat and Food Traders.  It acts to advise members of the organisation in meat and food trades, primarily butcher businesses. Membership provides numerous benefits, including: access to exclusive discounts, advise in training future employees, and maintaining good food hygiene and safety standards.

Organisational structure

Unlike trade unions, this organisation does not engage in collective bargaining with employers and merely gives members advice and discounts to further their businesses. Many butchery businesses are now incorporated into supermarkets, being represented as a part of the Union of Shop, Distributive and Allied Workers.

References 

Trade associations based in the United Kingdom
1900 establishments in the United Kingdom
Organisations based in Kent